Setina atroradiata is a moth of the family Erebidae. It was described by Francis Walker in 1864. It is found in South Africa.

References

 

Endemic moths of South Africa
Endrosina
Moths described in 1864